Patrick Whitesell (born February 4, 1965) is an American businessman and executive chairman of Endeavor, an entertainment and media agency. He joined the Endeavor Talent Agency as a partner in February 2001, where he was a member of the company’s Executive Committee.

Early life
Whitesell was born on February 4, 1965, in Iowa Falls, Iowa. He is the son of Patricia and John Patrick "Jack" Whitesell. His brothers are the late film and television actor Sean Whitesell, Thomas Whitesell, writer Christopher Whitesell, college basketball coach Jim Whitesell, and director John Whitesell. Whitesell graduated from Iowa Falls High School in 1983. He graduated from Luther College in Iowa in 1987.

Career
Whitesell worked at InterTalent from 1990 to 1992. He was an agent at United Talent Agency (UTA), from 1992 to 1995. Whitesell served as head of the talent department of Creative Artists Agency (CAA), from 1995 to 2001.

Whitesell and WME co-CEO Ari Emanuel have been characterized as “rewriting the Hollywood script,” and they have been named to Fortune’s Businessperson of the Year list.

Whitesell is an appointed member of the Governor's California Film Commission and an associate member of the Academy of Motion Picture Arts & Sciences.

Endeavor went public in 2021 with Whitesell owning a stake worth around $480 million according to Bloomberg.

He and Ari Emanuel are also co-CEO of IMG, a global sports, events and talent management company headquartered in New York City.

Personal life
Whitesell resides in Beverly Hills, California. He is divorced from Lauren Sanchez, and has two children. On November 28, 2020, he got engaged to Australian actress of Chilean descent Pia (née Loyola) Miller. In May 2021, it was reported they had been married.

References

External links

1965 births
Living people
People from Iowa Falls, Iowa
People from Beverly Hills, California
Luther College (Iowa) alumni
American talent agents
Hollywood talent agents
Whitesell family